Hendrum can refer to a community in the United States:

 Hendrum, Minnesota
 Hendrum Township, Norman County, Minnesota